The 1984 GP Ouest-France was the 48th edition of the GP Ouest-France cycle race and was held on 21 August 1984. The race started and finished in Plouay. The race was won by Sean Kelly of the Skil team.

General classification

References

1984
1984 in road cycling
1984 in French sport
August 1984 sports events in Europe